Jesse Miller may refer to:

 Jesse Miller (musician) (1921-1950), American musician
 Jesse Miller (politician) (1800-1850), American politician
 Jesse Miller (writer), American writer
 Jesse S. Miller, psychologist (1940-2006), American psychologist
 Jessie Miller, Australian aviator